The 1940 New Mexico gubernatorial election took place on November 5, 1940, in order to elect the Governor of New Mexico. Incumbent Democrat John E. Miles won reelection to a second term. Former governor Clyde Tingley unsuccessfully sought the Democratic nomination.

General election

Results

References

gubernatorial
1940
New Mexico
November 1940 events